Allan Glen's RFC is a rugby union side based in Bishopbriggs, East Dunbartonshire, Scotland.

History
Allan Glen's RFC was the rugby club connected with Allan Glen's School. The school closed in 1989 but the rugby club continues. The club now runs a 1st and 2nd XV and various youth sides.

Allan Glen's Sevens

The club run the Allan Glen's Sevens. The tournament began in 1975. Sides play for the Sir Andrew McCance Cup.

Notable former players

Men

Glasgow Warriors
The following former Allan Glen's players represented Glasgow Warriors.

Scotland
The following former Allan Glen's players represented Scotland.

Honours
 Scottish Unofficial Championship
 Champions: 1938-39
 Glasgow University Sevens
 Champions: 1963
 Greenock Sevens
 Champions: 1967
 Bearsden Sevens
 Champions: 1992
 Kilmarnock Sevens
 Champions: 1934

References 

Rugby union in East Dunbartonshire
Scottish rugby union teams
Bishopbriggs